Worldwide is the sixth album by Everything but the Girl, released on 1 October 1991.

"Old Friends", "Twin Cities" and "Talk to Me Like the Sea" were released as singles but didn't impact the charts. The album itself debuted at its peak at No. 29 in the UK but quickly dropped the chart. Thus, it became the least successful EBTG release, both critically and commercially.

In 2012, Edsel Records reissued Worldwide as a two-disc set which gathered other EPs released around the time (1992's Covers and 1993's The Only Living Boy in New York and I Didn't Know I Was Looking for Love) plus b-sides, demos and live recordings from 1990-1994.

Track listing

Personnel
Everything but the Girl
Tracey Thorn - vocals
Ben Watt - synthesizer, guitar, synthesizer bass, piano, organ, drum and sound programming, background vocals
with:
Ralph Salmins - drums, cymbals
James McMillan - flugelhorn, trumpet
Ralph Salmins - percussion
Geoff Gascoyne - bass
Damon Butcher - piano
Martin Ditcham - percussion
Greg Lester - guitar
Dick Oatts - alto & soprano saxophone
Peter Murray - organ
Steve Pearce - bass
Pete Whyman - tenor saxophone
Vinnie Colaiuta - drums
Technical
Jerry Boys - engineer
Richard Haughton - cover photography

Charts 
Album

References

Everything but the Girl albums
1991 albums
Blanco y Negro Records albums